The 14th IAAF World Half Marathon Championships were held in Edmonton, Canada on 1 October 2005. The competition was replaced by the World Road Running Championships in 2006 and 2007, but revived as IAAF World Half Marathon Championships in 2008. 

A total of 156 athletes, 87 men and 69 women, from 43 countries took part.  The four and a half lap course begins and ends in Hawrelak Park.  Detailed reports on the event and an appraisal of the results were given both
for the men's race and for the women's race.

Complete results were published for the men's race, for the women's race, for men's team, and for women's team.

Medallists

Race Results

Men's

Women's

Team Results

Men's

Women's

Participation
The participation of 156 athletes (87 men/69 women) from 43 countries is reported.

 (2)
 (1)
 (4)
 (5)
 (2)
 (10)
 (3)
 (1)
 (1)
 (1)
 (1)
 (2)
 (4)
 (9)
 (5)
 (1)
 (1)
 (5)
 (5)
 (6)
 (9)
 (7)
 (2)
 (1)
 (2)
 (3)
 (1)
 (1)
 (1)
 (4)
 (5)
 (5)
 (5)
 (1)
 (5)
 (8)
 (1)
 (3)
 (3)
 (4)
 (4)
 (10)
 (2)

See also
2005 in athletics (track and field)

References

External links
Official website

World Half Marathon Championships
World Half Marathon Championships
World Athletics Half Marathon Championships
W
IAAF World Half Marathon Championships
IAAF World Half Marathon Championships